Eric Bakie (6 January 1928 – 13 May 2015) was a Scottish footballer and civil servant.

Early life
Bakie was born in Edinburgh and grew up supporting local club Heart of Midlothian. One of his neighbours as a child was Lawrie Reilly, who later played for Scotland; the two remained lifelong friends. He attended North Merchiston Primary School before winning a bursary to the Royal High School. During his childhood he played for North Merchiston Boys Club, and he represented Scotland's Boys Clubs in matches against Wales and England. After leaving school he joined the Ministry of Labour as a civil servant. Bakie completed his national service in Cairo as a staff sergeant.

Football career
After completing his national service Bakie joined Hutchinson Vale in Edinburgh. He combined his football career with his job in the Ministry of Labour; in 1949 he was close to moving to London for work, and received interest from Arsenal. However, he remained in Scotland and instead signed for Aberdeen. He continued to live in Edinburgh, where he trained in the evenings at Hibernian's ground, and travelled to Aberdeen on Saturdays, the only time he saw his teammates. His debut for Aberdeen came in a 5–0 victory against Motherwell on 17 December 1949. Bakie struggled to secure a first-team place at Aberdeen due to his part-time status, and he was released on a free transfer in 1951. He made only three appearances for Aberdeen in the Scottish Football League during his two years with the club.

Bakie then signed for Dunfermline Athletic, still combining his football career with his civil service job. His contract at Dunfermline in the 1950s was "a minimum of £4 per week." He spent 6 seasons at Dunfermline and was their joint longest-serving player, alongside Ron Mailer. During his time with Dunfermline he scored 3 goals in 90 appearances in the league. After a season with St Johnstone, with whom he made 28 league appearances, he then dropped out of the league system to play for Duns, winning the Scottish Qualifying Cup on two occasions with them. He finally retired in 1963. He made a total of 121 league appearances for Aberdeen, Dunfermline Athletic and St Johnstone, and over 160 appearances for them in all competitions.

Later life and death
Bakie remained at the Ministry of Labour  throughout his working life. After retiring, he played golf and bowls. He died in Edinburgh on 13 May 2015, at the age of 87. He left behind his wife, two children, and several grandchildren.

References

1928 births
2015 deaths
Scottish footballers
Aberdeen F.C. players
Dunfermline Athletic F.C. players
St Johnstone F.C. players
Duns F.C. players
Scottish Football League players
Association football wing halves
Footballers from Edinburgh
Lothian Thistle Hutchison Vale F.C. players